P-17 was a mixed use skyscraper proposed for construction in Dubai, United Arab Emirates for the Tasameem group. The building will accommodate offices, a 5-star hotel and serviced apartments, and 176 residential apartments on the upper 19 floors.

Construction was planned to start in November 2008, but construction has still not started.  As a result of the financial crisis that hit Dubai in late 2009, P-17 is unlikely to be built.

References

Proposed buildings and structures in Dubai